Yish'i is a moshav in central Israel. Located near Beit Shemesh, it falls under the jurisdiction of Mateh Yehuda Regional Council.

History
The village was established on 12 July 1950 by immigrants from Yemen on land that had belonged to the depopulated Palestinian village of Dayr Aban. Its name it taken from Psalms 27:1;
The LORD is my light and my salvation; whom shall I fear? The LORD is the stronghold of my life; of whom shall I be afraid?
 
The modern village is built immediately west of the ruins of biblical Beit Shemesh (Hebrew: Tel Beit Shemesh, Arabic: ʿAin Shems). Directly to the south-west of the modern village lies another ancient ruin, believed to date back to the Second Temple period, now called Khurbet Bîr el-Leimûn (the Lemon well).

Gallery

References

Moshavim
Populated places established in 1950
Populated places in Jerusalem District
Yemeni-Jewish culture in Israel
1950 establishments in Israel